Hardcastle and McCormick is an American action crime drama television series that aired on ABC from September 18, 1983, through May 5, 1986. The series stars Brian Keith as Judge Milton C. Hardcastle and Daniel Hugh Kelly as ex-con and race car driver Mark "Skid" McCormick.

During an interview in the early 1980s, producer Stephen J. Cannell referred to the then-upcoming series as Rolling Thunder.

Premise
Los Angeles County Superior Court Judge Milton C. "Hardcase" Hardcastle is an eccentric judge notorious for being strict with the law in both his duties and towards defendants. Preparing for his retirement, he notices file drawers filled with 200 people who escaped conviction due to legal technicalities. Inspired by his childhood hero the Lone Ranger, Hardcastle desires to make the criminals answer for their crimes.

Mark McCormick is a smart-mouthed, streetwise car thief. He faces a long incarceration for his latest theft, a prototype sports car called the Coyote X, designed by his murdered best friend. Together, the judge and the car thief strike a deal in which Hardcastle helps McCormick catch the murderer and McCormick agrees to work (his conditional parole) as the judge's agent. In addition, McCormick is allowed to keep the Coyote, which proves to be an excellent pursuit vehicle for their needs.

Cast
 Brian Keith as Judge Milton C. "Hardcase" Hardcastle
 Daniel Hugh Kelly as "Skid" Mark McCormick
 Mary Jackson as Sarah Wicks (1983)
 John Hancock as Lt. Michael Delaney (1984–85) 
 Ed Bernard as Lt. Bill Giles (1984–85)
 Joe Santos as Lt. Frank Harper (1985–86)
 John Ashley as narrator during show opening

Episodes

Season 1 (1983–84)

Season 2 (1984–85)

Season 3 (1985–86)

Production

Development
The series premise was somewhat recycled from a previous Cannell series, Tenspeed and Brown Shoe. It was created by Patrick Hasburgh and Stephen J. Cannell, serving as the executive producers and produced by Stephen J. Cannell Productions for ABC.

Music
The opening theme song during season one was "Drive", composed by Mike Post and Stephen Geyer and sung by David Morgan. For the first 12 episodes of season two, the theme song was "Back To Back", also composed by Post and Geyer, but sung by Joey Scarbury (who also sang Post and Geyer's theme for The Greatest American Hero). Public demand, however, resulted in the "Drive" theme being reinstated in episode 13 and kept through season three. Post and Pete Carpenter scored the music for the series.

"Coyote X" or "Cody Coyote"
The car that McCormick drove, the Coyote X, was built from custom molds based on the McLaren M6GT. The original Coyote X was molded, modified and assembled by Mike Fennel and Unique Movie Cars.  The nose, windshield, doors, and lower body (minus the ventral intakes) are faithful representations of the McLaren; the cut-down rear deck, however, was a custom component that became a feature on many Manta Montage kits with damaged or removed rear windows. The most noticeable differences between the Coyotes and Mantas are the wheel wells, roll pan height and shape, and the fact that the Coyote has a one-piece front clip that terminates about an inch before and surrounding the windshield.

Most of the cars made for the show were molded and assembled by either Mike Fennel or Unique Movie Cars. Like many kit cars of the time, the car uses a chassis from a Volkswagen Beetle and its engine from a Porsche 914. For the second and third seasons, producers used a different Coyote which was based on a DMC DeLorean, as Brian Keith had difficulty getting in and out of the original Coyote.

The season-two and -three Coyote does not resemble the Manta, as the front is larger than the original, making the car resemble a front-engined car. The season-one "Hero" car that was used in the production of Hardcastle and McCormick is owned by a private owner in New York. The stunt/skid car (used in all three seasons) was reconfigured for the Knight Rider 2000 television pilot, then consequently turned into Jay Ohrberg's show car "Taz-Mobile". In April 2011, the stunt/skid car was sold and shipped to Dallas, Texas, where it was rebodied back to its former Coyote configuration, retaining as many of the original Coyote pieces as possible (in a private collection).  Note: only one season-one "Hero Car" and one "skid/stunt" car were used in all three seasons and several (center seat-mounted, dune buggy-like, see title shot) "jump cars" were used. A season-two and -three (De Lorean body) car appeared briefly on the sixth episode of season five of the sitcom Married... with Children.

Reception

Nielsen ratings
 1983–84: #15 (18.71 rating)
 1984–85: #39 (15.82 rating)
 1985–86: #52 (13.9 rating)

Home media
Visual Entertainment has released all three seasons of Hardcastle and McCormick on DVD in Region 1 (Canada only).  VEI also released Hardcastle & McCormick: The Complete Series on DVD on September 3, 2008.  As of March 2016, the complete DVD set is available on Amazon.com.

References

External links

 
 
 

1980s American crime drama television series
1983 American television series debuts
1986 American television series endings
American Broadcasting Company original programming
Fictional duos
Television duos
Television series by Sony Pictures Television
Television shows set in Los Angeles
Television series by Stephen J. Cannell Productions
Television series created by Stephen J. Cannell